Panderevela  is a genus of sacoglossan sea slugs, a shell-less marine opisthobranchi gastropod mollusks in the family Costasiellidae.

Species
 Panderevela dacilae Moro & Ortea, 2015
 Panderevela hyllebergi K. R. Jensen, 2021
 Panderevela ipse Ortea, Moro & Espinosa, 2015

References

 Moro L. & Ortea J. (2015). Nuevos taxones de babosas marinas de las islas Canarias y de Cabo Verde (Mollusca: Heterobranchia). Vieraea. 43: 21-86.

 Costasiellidae
Gastropod genera